Equestrian at the 2016 Summer Paralympics consists of 11 dressage events, ten for individual riders across five classes, and a single mixed team, mixed category event. The competitions were held in the Olympic Equestrian Centre in Rio, in September 2016.

Classification
Riders are given a classification depending on the type and extent of their disability. The classification system allowed riders to compete against others with a similar level of function.

Athletes are classified according to their functional ability when mounted across four grades and five categories (Ia and Ib, II, III and IV). The grading determines the complexity of the movements riders perform with their horses during their tests, ensuring that the tests are judged on the skill of the rider, regardless of their impairment. Riders may use permitted assistive devices such as dressage whips, connecting rein bars looped reins, and the like. Riders who have visual impairments are permitted to use 'callers' to help them navigate around the arena.

Riders with recovering or deteriorating conditions such as MS are eligible but must have been reclassified within six months of a World Championships or Paralympic Games to ensure their classification is correct.

Specialised equipment including prostheses is only allowed where it has been specifically approved.

Qualification

The following teams and individuals have attained quota places for the 2016 Summer Paralympics Equestrian event. On 25 March, FEI announced that France and Russia, having achieved multiple quota places for individuals, would be able to field composite teams in the team competition, bringing the total number of teams in that event to 16.

Officials
Appointment of officials is as follows:

Dressage
  Alison Pauline King (Ground Jury President)
  Hanneke Gerritsen (Ground Jury Member)
  Anne Prain (Ground Jury Member)
  Kjell Myhre (Ground Jury Member)
  Marc Urban (Ground Jury Member)
  Marco Orsini (Ground Jury Member)
  Sarah Leitch (Ground Jury Member)

Events

Participating nations
76 athletes from 29 nations competed.

Medal table

Medal summary

References

External links
Official website of the 2016 Summer Paralympics
Official Paralympics website
FEI:Fédération Equestre Internationale

 
2016
2016 Summer Paralympics events
2016 in equestrian
Equestrian sports competitions in Brazil
Para Dressage